Axis Mundi is the fourth studio album by technical death metal band Decrepit Birth, released on July 21, 2017, via Nuclear Blast (in North America) and Agonia (in Europe and the rest of the world). It is the band's first studio album to feature drummer Sam Paulicelli and bassist Sean Martinez, as well as the first album since 2010's Polarity.

Recording and release
Axis Mundi was recorded during 2015–2016 at various studios: drums part were recorded by Ryan Forsyth at Private Ear Studios in Winnipeg, Canada; bass and guitars part were recorded at guitarist Matt Sotelo and bassist Sean Martinez's own studios respectively. Stefano Morabito handled the mixing and mastering duties at 16th Cellar Studios in Rome, Italy. The cover artwork was once again designed by artist Dan Seagrave.

On September 3, 2015, drummer Sam Paulicelli posted a studio footage on YouTube about his drum tracking for Decrepit Birth's brand new album. On September 22, 2015, the band confirmed on their Facebook page that vocalist Bill Robinson was in the studio tracking vocal part. The album was officially completed on October 17, 2016.

On May 18, 2017, the band announced that the album would be released on July 21, 2017, along with the track listing, cover artwork and an accompanying 360° lyric video for the song "Epigenetic Triplicty". The second song "Hieroglyphic" was available for streaming on YouTube on June 15, 2017.

Background
In the band's official biography, guitarist and main songwriter Matt Sotelo commented on Axis Mundi:

Track listing

Personnel
Credits are adapted from the album's liner notes.

Decrepit Birth
 Bill Robinson − vocals
 Matt Sotelo − guitars, bass (track 11), MIDI sequencing
 Sam Paulicelli − drums, bass (track 10)
 Sean Martinez − bass

Additional musicians
 Paul McGuire − backing vocals (track 2)

Production
 Ryan Forsyth − recording (drums)
 Stefano Morabito − re-amping, mixing, mastering
 Dan Seagrave − cover art
 Michał "P. (Cursed Art)" Kaczkowski − layout
 Tyler Asselin – photography

References

2017 albums
Decrepit Birth albums
Nuclear Blast albums